Frojach-Katsch is a former municipality in the district of Murau in Styria, Austria. Since the 2015 Styria municipal structural reform, it is part of the municipality Teufenbach-Katsch.

Population

References

Cities and towns in Murau District